Lander Loockx (born 25 April 1997) is a Belgian cyclist, who currently rides for UCI Cyclo-cross team Deschacht–Group Hens–Containers Maes.

Major results

2014–2015
 3rd National Junior Championships
 3rd Azencross Juniors
 Junior BPost Bank Trophy
3rd Essen
2016–2017
 2nd Göthenburg Cyclecross Raceweekend
2017–2018
 2nd Int. Radquerfeldein GP Lambach
 3rd Grand Prix Möbel Alvisse
 3rd Cyclo-cross de Balan Ardennes
2018–2019
 Under-23 DVV Trophy
1st Brussels
 1st Int. Radquerfeldein GP Lambach
 National Trophy Series
2nd Crawley
 2nd Hotondcross Under-23
 3rd Munich Super Cross
2019–2020
 1st Jingle Cross 1
 1st Grand Prix Trnava
2020–2021
 1st Grand Prix Trnava
 1st Grand Prix Podbrezova
 Toi Toi Cup
1st Holé Vrchy
2nd Mladá Boleslav
2021–2022
 1st Ciclocross Internacional Llodio
 1st Grand Prix Podbrezova
 2nd Cyclo-cross de Karrantza
 Toi Toi Cup
2nd Mladá Boleslav
 2nd Grand Prix Dohňany
 2nd Grand-prix de la Commune de Contern

References

External links

Lander Loockx at Cyclocross 24

1997 births
Living people
Belgian male cyclists
Cyclo-cross cyclists
Sportspeople from Leuven
Cyclists from Flemish Brabant